The 2012–13 La Salle Explorers basketball team represented La Salle University during the 2012–13 NCAA Division I men's basketball season. The Explorers, led by ninth year head coach John Giannini, played their home games at Tom Gola Arena and were members of the Atlantic 10 Conference. They finished the season 24–10, 11–5 in A-10 play to finish in a three way tie for third place. They lost in the quarterfinals of the Atlantic 10 tournament to Butler. They received an at-large bid to the 2013 NCAA tournament, their first NCAA bid in 21 years. They defeated Boise State in the First Four, Kansas State in the Round of 64, and Ole Miss in the Round of 32 to advance to the Sweet Sixteen where they lost to Wichita State.

Roster

Schedule

|-
!colspan=12| Exhibition

|-
!colspan=12| Regular season

|-
!colspan=12|2013 Atlantic 10 tournament

|-
!colspan=12| 2013 NCAA tournament

References

La Salle Explorers men's basketball seasons
La Salle
La Salle
La Salle Explorers men's basketball
La Salle Explorers men's basketball